Spencer Moore (born July 25, 1990) is a professional Canadian football fullback for the Montreal Alouettes of the Canadian Football League. He was drafted in the fifth round, 44th overall by the Saskatchewan Roughriders in the 2013 CFL Draft and signed with the team on May 30, 2013. He was traded to the Alouettes in December 2018 for a conditional eighth-round draft pick.

He played CIS football for the McMaster Marauders and was part of the 47th Vanier Cup championship team.

Professional career
Moore was placed on the suspended list by the Montreal Alouettes on July 6, 2021.

References

External links
Saskatchewan Roughriders bio

1990 births
Living people
Players of Canadian football from Ontario
Canadian football fullbacks
McMaster Marauders football players
Montreal Alouettes players
Saskatchewan Roughriders players
Sportspeople from Hamilton, Ontario